King Tirian (born between 2530 and 2535, Narnian time) is a fictional character from C. S. Lewis's fantasy series The Chronicles of Narnia. He is the protagonist of The Last Battle, on which he is the last King of Narnia, who has to defend his kingdom against subversion and invasion. He is well respected by the Narnians, and a skilled swordsman. He is descended from Prince Caspian, and is the son of King Erlian. His closest friend is Jewel the Unicorn.

Troubles in Narnia cause King Tirian to doubt the purported return of Aslan. Enraged at Calormene treatment of a talking beast, he and Jewel slay the men, but are then filled with guilt at this act and surrender to the Calormene enclave and Shift. There Tirian witnesses the fraudulent exhibition of 'Aslan' and is sentenced to death by Shift. He prays for Aslan or the friends of Narnia to come save Narnia, and Eustace and Jill come to his rescue.

He leads an assault upon the Calormenes at the stable and, on the verge of defeat, wrestles their leader Rishda Tarkaan into the stable to meet Tash. There he finds himself in Aslan's Country, meets High King Peter, King Edmund, Lord Digory, Lady Polly and Queen Lucy, and bears witness to the end of Narnia.

References

The Chronicles of Narnia characters
Literary characters introduced in 1956
Kings and Queens of Narnia
Fictional kings
Fictional swordfighters